Vincent Ignatius Breen (January 12, 1911 – December 31, 1986) was a Roman Catholic priest of the United States dioceses of San Francisco and Oakland, California.

Born in San Francisco (Potrero Hill) in 1910 to an Irish steamfitter, Breen received ordination from St. Patrick's Seminary in Menlo Park in 1936, serving as parish priest for Stockton, California from 1936 to 1937. From 1938 to 1941, Breen attended Catholic University in Washington, D.C., receiving a PhD in Labor Relations in 1942. He served as the Assistant Superintendent of San Francisco Archdiocese Catholic Schools 1942 until 1943 or 1944, and was the founding Principal of Junípero Serra High School, serving in that position from 1944 until 1952. Breen served as Pastor for Holy Ghost (later, Holy Spirit) Parish in Fremont, California from 1953 until 1982. Breen died in 1986 in California.

He is listed by the Oakland diocese as credibly accused of sexual abuse of minors for the entire period he was with the church. This means the diocese considers that "there is reason to believe the allegation is more likely than not to be true" after investigating the claims.

References

1911 births
1986 deaths
American people of Irish descent
Catholic University of America alumni
Catholics from California